Prodigal Genius: The Life of Nikola Tesla is a 1944 book by John Joseph O'Neill detailing the life of Nikola Tesla.

Overview
Written by Pulitzer Prize-winning author John J. O'Neill, the life of Nikola Tesla details the life of a pioneer in electrical engineering. O'Neill was a close friend of Tesla, whom he had met as a boy and remained in contact with.

The book covers, among other topics, the story of Tesla's father's inspiration for his career in engineering, shows his theories of electricity that went against the scientific establishment, explores the friendships of Tesla, investigates the story of Tesla's lost Nobel Prize, and explains Tesla's investigations of the paranormal.

References

External links
 Prodigal Genius, rastko.org.yu.

1944 non-fiction books
Books about Nikola Tesla
American biographies